Viña San Pedro Airport,  is an airport  west of Molina, a city in the Maule Region of Chile.

The airport lies alongside the Pan-American Highway. There is distant high terrain to the west.

See also

Transport in Chile
List of airports in Chile

References

External links
OpenStreetMap - Viña San Pedro
OurAirports - Viña San Pedro
FallingRain - Viña San Pedro Airport

Airports in Chile
Airports in Maule Region